Dwarda is a small town in the Wheatbelt region of Western Australia,  south of the town of Wandering on the Hotham River.

History
The name is a contraction of nearby Dwardadine Creek, with "dwarda" being a Noongar name for the dingo. The townsite was first requested by the Wandering Road Board in 1912, with the hope it could become a future terminus for the Hotham Valley Railway, and the townsite, initially called "Dampier", was gazetted in 1914. The town however did not attract settlement. In 1940-41 a timber mill was built here by JC "Charlie" Tucak, and operated for some years.

The townsite is owned by the Horan family, though most of the buildings were destroyed by arson in the mid-1980s.

References

Towns in Western Australia
Wheatbelt (Western Australia)